The American Apparel Ad Girls, commonly abbreviated as The AAA Girls, are a drag queen supergroup composed of Alaska Thunderfuck 5000, Courtney Act, and Willam Belli. On July 7, 2017 they released their debut extended play Access All Areas.

History
In September 2014 the fashion brand American Apparel recruited RuPaul's Drag Race contestants Alaska, Courtney Act, and Willam to be the faces of their new ad campaign. They were the first drag queens to be ad girls for the brand. To promote the new partnership, they released their debut single, "American Apparel Ad Girls", a parody of "Farrah Fawcett Hair" by Capital Cities. The song charted at number 10 on the Billboard Comedy Digital songs chart and was later included on Willam's 2015 studio album Shartistry in Motion.

Later in 2014 they released a Christmas single, "Dear Santa, Bring Me a Man". In 2015 the group reunited for a track called "The Shade of It All" which was included on Alaska Thunderfuck's album Anus. They also recorded a song for the first Christmas Queens album. In 2017 they released their debut extended play Access All Areas. To promote the EP they embarked on the Access All Areas Tour.

Discography

Extended plays

Singles

Other appearances

See also
 DWV (group)

References

Drag groups
Musical groups established in 2014
Musical trios
Pop music supergroups